George Vasilakos is President and art director of Eden Studios, Inc., and handles the majority of the day-to-day business of the company.

Career
George Vasilakos founded Imagination Games & Comics, a New York game store, in 1992, after he finished art school. Vasilakos and a few others at his store decided to make their own collectible card game, and with input from attorney M. Alexander Jurkat, they formed New Millenium Entertainment and published the Battlelords CCG (1995) and the role-playing game Conspiracy X (1996). Vasilakos was the art director for New Millenium Entertainment. New Millenium went out of business after being unable to deal with its CCG-related debts, and on July 4, 1997, Vasilakos and Jurkat - together with investor Ed Healy - announced that they had formed the new gaming company, Eden Studios; they also acquired the rights to Conspiracy X from their former New Millenium Entertainment partners to continue the line. Vasilakos shut down his Imagination Games & Comics store in June 1997 to begin working full-time for Eden Studios. Vasilakos and Jurkat were fans of C.J. Carella's work, and in July 1998 they announced an exclusive license to Carella's WitchCraft and Armageddon role-playing games, previously published by small-press roleplaying company Myrmidon Press. Vasilakos was the inspiration behind the Abduction and Knights of the Dinner Table: HACK! card games.

In 1999, Vasilakos was offered a job with Last Unicorn Games so he moved to California to join their office, while remaining President of Eden Studios. Vasilakos stayed with Last Unicorn Games after they were bought by Wizards of the Coast in 2000, and Decipher, Inc. in 2001. Vasilakos was the art director at Last Unicorn, and retained that position at Wizards and Decipher. Vasilakos and Christopher Shy conceived of the RPG All Flesh Must Be Eaten (2000). At Decipher, Vasilakos worked on the Star Trek and Lord of the Rings RPGs. Vasilakos directed all the graphics work on the Buffy the Vampire Slayer, Angel, and Army of Darkness roleplaying game lines for Eden Studios. In June 2003, Vasilakos opened a new game store in Albany, New York called Zombie Planet.

George Vasilakos helped graphic artist Francis Hogan develop the kid-friendly RPG Adventure Maximus.

Personal life
Vasilakos lives in Loudonville, New York with his wife and two sons, Theo and Dimitri and daughter Sophia.

References

American graphic designers
Living people
People from Loudonville, New York
Place of birth missing (living people)
Year of birth missing (living people)